Dördçinar is a village in the Fuzuli District of Azerbaijan. The village was occupied by Armenian forces during the First Nagorno-Karabakh War. On 20 October 2020, Azerbaijani president Ilham Aliyev stated that the village had been recaptured by Azerbaijani forces.

References 

Populated places in Fuzuli District